Rick is a 2003 American comedy drama film directed and edited by Curtiss Clayton (in his feature directorial debut) and written by Daniel Handler, based on the 1851 opera Rigoletto by Giuseppe Verdi, itself based on the 1832 play Le roi s'amuse by Victor Hugo. The film stars Bill Pullman, Aaron Stanford, Agnes Bruckner, Dylan Baker, and Sandra Oh.

Plot
The film chronicles the tragic fall of a middle-aged corporate climber who has lost sight of his humanity, Rick O'Lette.

Cast
 Bill Pullman as Rick O'Lette
 Aaron Stanford as Duke
 Agnes Bruckner as Eve O'Lette
 Dylan Baker as Buck
 Sandra Oh as Michelle
 Emmanuelle Chriqui as Duke's Long-Suffering Wife
 Marianne Hagan as Laura
 Jamie Harris as Mick
 Paz de la Huerta as Vicki
 Dennis Parlato as BusinessTalk Anchor
 Daniel Handler (cameo) as Perky waiter

Reception

Critical response
The review aggregator website Rotten Tomatoes reported an approval rating of 46%, with an average rating of 6/10, based on 24 reviews.

References

External links
 
 

2003 films
Films with screenplays by Daniel Handler
2003 comedy-drama films
Films based on works by Victor Hugo
Films based on operas by Giuseppe Verdi
2003 comedy films
2003 drama films
2000s English-language films
2003 directorial debut films
Films set in New York City
Films set in Manhattan